Wharton County Junior College (WCJC) is a public community college with its main campus in Wharton, Texas. The college also has campuses in Richmond, Sugar Land, and Bay City. WCJC is accredited by the Southern Association of Colleges and Schools (SACS).

WCJC is a comprehensive community college offering a wide range of postsecondary educational programs and services including associate degrees, certificates, and continuing-education courses. WCJC prepares students for a broad understanding of the liberal arts in order for students transferring to baccalaureate degree-granting institutions.

The idea of starting Wharton County Junior College started in 1944; the first session of classes beginning in 1946 with approximately 200 students. In the fall 2007 semester, the college had a total enrollment of 5,892 students.

State Representative Phil Stephenson served on the Wharton County Junior College board of trustees from 1997 to 2012, when he was first elected to the legislature from District 85 in Fort Bend, Wharton, and Jackson counties.

Wharton also has volleyball, baseball, and rodeo teams. The athletic teams are nicknamed the Pioneers.

As defined by the Texas Legislature, the official service area of WCJC is the following:
all of Wharton County,
the territory within the Kendleton, Lamar, and Needville school districts, and the territory within the incorporated area and extraterritorial jurisdiction of Sugar Land, all in Fort Bend County,
the territory within the Wallis-Orchard Independent School District in Austin County,
the territory within the Columbus, Rice Consolidated, and Weimar school districts in Colorado County,
the territory within the Ganado Independent School District in Jackson County,
the territory within the Bay City, Boling, Matagorda, Palacios, Tidehaven, and Van Vleck school districts in Matagorda County.

See also

Sugar Land, Texas
Wharton, Texas
Fort Bend County, Texas
Wharton County, Texas

References

External links
Official website

Educational institutions established in 1946
Universities and colleges accredited by the Southern Association of Colleges and Schools
Community colleges in Texas
Education in Wharton County, Texas
Buildings and structures in Wharton County, Texas
Education in Fort Bend County, Texas
Education in Matagorda County, Texas
1946 establishments in Texas
Two-year colleges in the United States